John William Lees (26 July 1892–1983) was an English footballer who played in the Football League for Halifax Town and Preston North End.

References

1892 births
1983 deaths
English footballers
Association football defenders
English Football League players
Northwich Victoria F.C. players
Preston North End F.C. players
Halifax Town A.F.C. players